Kusheshwar Asthan is a town and a notified area of the Darbhanga in the Indian state of Bihar.

Cities and towns in Darbhanga district